Nantawat Suankaeo (born 8 December 1998) is a Thai footballer who plays as a forward for Chiangmai United in Thai League 2 (on loan from Port).

International career
In 2020, He played the 2020 AFC U-23 Championship with Thailand U23.

References

1998 births
Living people
Nantawat Suankaew
Nantawat Suankaew
Association football forwards
Nantawat Suankaew
Nantawat Suankaew